Donna Payant née Collins (March 22, 1950 – May 15, 1981) was a New York state corrections officer who was murdered while on duty at Green Haven Correctional Facility. She was one of 50 women serving as a Correction Officer at Green Haven Correctional Facility.

Donna Payant attended the corrections officers' academy in 1981, and had only worked at Greenhaven for about a month at the time of her murder. The mother of three children, her husband was also a corrections officer, though at a different facility. Her father, too, had been a corrections officer at the Clinton Prison for over 28 years. Payant's assignment was to guard a cell block that included convicted murderer Lemuel Smith, and to bring inmates to the dining hall and escort them back.

Subsequent investigation revealed that Payant had been killed by inmate Lemuel Smith, a rapist and two-time convicted murderer who was already serving two life sentences. She was lured to the prison chaplain's office by the perpetrator posing as another corrections employee. Smith was working in the chaplain's office at the time. The autopsy showed that Payant died by strangulation.

After killing her, Smith wrapped her body in plastic, stuffed it into a 55-gallon drum and disposed of it in a dumpster. When she was found to be missing, the prison was locked down and searched. No trace was found, but search dogs traced her scent to the dumping area. The next morning the landfill was searched and her body was found. 

After his two murder convictions, Smith confessed to two other killings, but prosecutors had declined to try him since he was already in prison. For killing Officer Payant, Smith was convicted of murder for the third time. He was sentenced to death on June 10, 1983.  In 1984, his sentence was commuted to life in prison when the death penalty was found to be contrary to New York's constitution. As of 2016, Payant was the sole female correctional officer in New York State to die in the line of duty.

References

External links
 Memorial
 Forensic Files - Season 6, Episode 24: Pastoral Care, FilmRise Documentaries
 Two-time murderer accused of killing a prison guard, New York Times, June 7, 1981
 findagrave.com, Donna Payant

1950 births
1981 deaths
1981 murders in the United States
American murder victims
American prison officers
Criminal justice
Deaths by strangulation in the United States
People murdered in New York (state)
Victims of serial killers
New York (state) prison officers